Lumos may refer to:

Lumos (charity), a charity founded by J.K. Rowling
Lumos Networks, a fiber optic network service provider based in the United States
A magic spell that makes light in the Harry Potter series; see Magic in Harry Potter
Lumos (album), a 2019 album by Harry and the Potters